Adalbert (1000 – 11 November 1048 in Thuin) was the Duke of Upper Lorraine from 1047 until his death the next year. He was the first son of Gerhard IV, Count of Metz, and Gisela (Gisella), possibly a daughter of Theodoric I, Duke of Upper Lorraine. Gerard's father Adalbert had inherited the county of Metz from his brother Gerhard of the Moselle.

Gothelo I, Duke of Lower Lorraine and Upper Lorraine, died in 1044 and was succeeded by his son Godfrey III in Upper Lorraine but was refused Lower Lorraine. Irritated, Godfrey rebelled in that same year and devastated his suzerain's lands in Lower Lorraine. He was soon defeated and Adalbert named in his place in Upper Lorraine. Godfrey continued to fight for all Lorraine and Adalbert died in battle against him at Thuin on 11 November 1048. He had no known sons, and Henry III, Holy Roman Emperor immediately nominated his brother Gerhard to succeed him.

See also
 Dukes of Lorraine family tree

Notes

Dukes of Upper Lorraine
1000 births
1048 deaths
Military personnel killed in action